Anna Beatriz Barbosa Ferreira (born 3 August 2000), known as Anna Bia, is a Brazilian footballer who plays as a goalkeeper for Santos.

Club career
Born in São Paulo, Anna Bia played for the under-17 side of Tiger Academia, before joining Chapecoense for the 2018 season. She left the latter side in the following year, and subsequently moved to Bahia.

On 19 November 2021, Anna Bia left Bahia, and joined Santos the following 3 February. On 19 April 2022, after her debut with the Sereias (a 6–0 win over ), she gave a post-match interview that went viral, after saying that she "liked seeing death stuff".

Honours
Bahia
: 2021

References

2000 births
Living people
Footballers from São Paulo
Brazilian women's footballers
Women's association football goalkeepers
Campeonato Brasileiro de Futebol Feminino Série A1 players
Santos FC (women) players